Tomb KV13, located in the Valley of the Kings in Egypt, was cut and decorated for the burial of the noble Bay of the Nineteenth Dynasty. An ostraca published in the French Egyptological journal BIFAO in 2000 records that Chancellor Bay was executed by pharaoh Siptah. Consequently, Bay was never buried in his tomb. Moreover, no funerary goods were found in the tomb belonging to Bay. It was later reused by two princes of the Twentieth Dynasty, Mentuherkhepsef, a son of Ramesses III, and his nephew, Amenherkhepshef, a son of Ramesses VI.

References

Further reading 
Reeves, N & Wilkinson, R.H. The Complete Valley of the Kings, 1996, Thames and Hudson, London.
Siliotti, A. Guide to the Valley of the Kings and to the Theban Necropolises and Temples, 1996, A.A. Gaddis, Cairo.

External links
Theban Mapping Project: KV13 includes description, images and plans of the tomb.

Buildings and structures completed in the 12th century BC
Valley of the Kings